The 1894 season was the eleventh season of regional competitive association football in Australia. There were two league competitions and two cup competitions fielded by Northern District British Football Association (Northern NSW) and the South British Football Soccer Association (New South Wales).

League competitions

Cup competitions

(Note: figures in parentheses display the club's competition record as winners/runners-up.)

See also 

 Soccer in Australia

References 

Seasons in Australian soccer
1894 in Australian sport
Australian soccer by year
Australian soccer